Epicrates (Epikratês) was a citizen of ancient Athens who took a prominent part in public affairs after the end of the Peloponnesian War.

He was a zealous member of the democratic party, and had a share in the overthrow of the Thirty Tyrants. But afterwards, when sent on an embassy to the Persian king Artaxerxes, he was accused not only of corruption, in receiving money from Artaxerxes, but also of embezzlement. Hegesander and Plutarch say that he so grossly flattered Artaxerxes as to propose that instead of nine archons, nine ambassadors to the Persian king should be annually chosen by the Athenians. Plutarch also says that he did not deny the charge of corruption. He seems, however, to have been acquitted, probably through the powerful interest possessed by himself and by his fellow criminal, Phormisius. He had been guilty of corruption on a former occasion also, but had been equally fortunate in escaping punishment. 

This first offence of his was probably on the occasion when Timocrates of Rhodes was sent by Tithraustes to bribe the Greek states to attack Sparta in 395 BC. For though Xenophon asserts that the Athenians did not receive any money from Timocrates (a statement suspicious on the face of it), Pausanias has preserved an account that at Athens bribes were taken by Cephalus and Epicrates.

The above statement of the acquittal of Epicrates on the charge of corruption in his embassy to Artaxerxes, seems at first sight opposed to the statement of Demosthenes that he was condemned to death, and that he was actually banished. But, in fact, Demosthenes seems to be referring to a distinct and third occasion on which Epicrates was charged with corruption. For in his repetition of the charge there is the important head, katapseudomenoi tôn summachôn, of which we find nothing in the oration of Lysias, but which is just the charge we should expect to be made against the Athenian envoy who took part in accepting the Peace of Antalcidas (387 BC). That Epicrates was really that envoy is the more probable from the fact, which is expressly stated, that it was Epicrates who recommended that peace to the Athenians.

Epicrates and Phormisius were attacked by Aristophanes (and by Plato), the comic poet, who made their embassy the subject of a whole play, the Presbeis. Both are ridiculed for their large beards, and for this reason Epicrates was called sakesphuros.

References

Footnotes

5th-century BC Athenians
4th-century BC Athenians
Ambassadors in Greek Antiquity
Athenians of the Corinthian War